Ben Hall (born 16 January 1997) is a Northern Irish footballer who plays as a defender for NIFL Premiership side Linfield.

Club career

Motherwell

Born in Enniskillen, Hall started his career at Mountjoy United then moved to Irish League side Dungannon Swifts. In the summer of 2013, Hall signed a two-year contract with Scottish Premiership club Motherwell. In his first two seasons, Hall had become a regular in the Motherwell Under-20 setup. Hall made a surprise first team debut on 12 December 2015, starting at centre-back in a 3–1 home win over Dundee. He scored his first Motherwell goal on 30 December 2015, in a 2–0 win over St Johnstone.

Brighton & Hove Albion

On 14 June 2016, Hall signed a two-year contract with Brighton & Hove Albion FC, initially linking up with the Seagulls' U21 team. He was released from Brighton at the end of the 2018–19 season. In January 2018, he went on loan to Notts County until the end of the season, in order to get more experience of senior football. On 14 May 2018, Brighton announced that they were taking up the option of extending his contract by another year.

Partick Thistle
Hall signed a short-term contract with Partick Thistle in August 2019.

Falkirk
Hall moved to Falkirk in January 2020. He made his debut for the Bairns on 25 January 2020, scoring two goals in the 6-0 win over Forfar Athletic. Ben left Falkirk by mutual consent on the 31st January 2022.

Linfield
On the same day he left Falkirk, it was reported that Hall had returned to Northern Ireland, signing a two-and-a-half year contract with Linfield.

International career
Hall has appeared for the Northern Ireland, at every age level from Under-15 to Under-21.

References

External links
 Ben Hall profile at Motherwell FC official website
 

1997 births
Living people
People from Enniskillen
Association footballers from Northern Ireland
Association football defenders
Dungannon Swifts F.C. players
Motherwell F.C. players
Notts County F.C. players
Brighton & Hove Albion F.C. players
Partick Thistle F.C. players
Falkirk F.C. players
Scottish Professional Football League players
Northern Ireland youth international footballers
English Football League players